is a manga series written by Dall-Young Lim and illustrated by Hae-Won Lee. The series revolves around Kouta Inamine, a young manga artist whose streak of failures takes a drastic turn when he is hired by a famous B-rated editor.

Koimoku began serialization in the March 2011 issue of Kill Time Communication's seinen manga magazine Comic Valkyrie, published on January 27, 2011, and ended in the November 2012 issue. The first volume was released on July 27, 2011, and the fifth and final volume released on November 29, 2012.

Plot
Kouta Inamine is a young man with dreams of becoming a professional manga artist, but his constant mistakes has caused him to be fired from almost every manga magazine in Tokyo. After being fired from yet another manga magazine, he believes his life to be over. However, his life takes a drastic turn when he finds out that his next door neighbor, Hinata Sawanoguchi, is revealed to be a famous editor for a B-rated manga magazine, and Hinata recruits him for her manga magazine. The story mainly focuses on the process of making and serializing manga, from concept to completion and the real-life stresses that come with it, with a comedic touch.

Characters

Main characters

A 20 year-old man and a manga artist who moved to Tokyo two years prior to fulfill his lifelong dream of becoming a successful manga author, but is occasionally fired from each manga magazine. He is then recruited to Comic Splash by his next door neighbor Hinata after he was fired from Comic Heat. He is revealed to be a virgin, and as a result has poor experience with women. It is revealed by Hinata that Kouta is a "trigger-type" artist, an artist who can produce amazing results if something stimulates them (sexual or otherwise). This ability was first shown after Kouta saw Mika Fujiwara's breasts once, which inspired him to draw more buxom women for his manga. He was influenced to become a manga artist since childhood, and was influenced by Ozma's works. Five years later, Kouta has become a successful manga artist and is married to his editor, Sayaka Jumonji, and they are expecting their baby girl.

She shows two sides to herself: a ditzy woman outside of work and a serious editor at work. Prior to recruiting Kouta, Hinata gave Ryujirou Mine, one of Kouta's superiors, his big break at Comic Splash before he became a ten million seller. The rumors of Hinata's sexual appetite, which started when she managed Mine's debut work "Farewell, Tokyo", are based on the fact that Hinata pokes excessively into the private lives of her signed manga artists. Hinata also has a reputation as a novice eater who pushes her artists to the utmost extreme and burning most of them out for every star she produces, and making them change their style to make it more market-friendly instead of having more fidelity to their personal tastes.

It is revealed in chapter 8 that she had her career ruined following an incident with a famous manga author (Ozma, later revealed to be Omura), but she assented to it. At the time, she was always called in by top magazines and stole promising newbies, afterwards she worked at lower grade magazines. It is later revealed that she was Ozma's mentor in the past, and her teachings later became a base for his management system upon founding his studio.

A bespectacled girl who works at Comfy's, a dating club, where she assumes a kogal/ganguro appearance. Originally called by Kouta to improve his experience with women, she takes an interest in Kouta's manga upon seeing his unfinished manuscript, even proclaiming herself to be his "number-one fan".

A girl hired by Hinata as Kouta's assistant. Despite her childlike appearance, she is actually 20 years old and currently attending college. She has a fiery temper and dislikes being called a little girl. Initially Kouta was skeptical about her expertise in manga, but after seeing her superb artwork, he eventually hires her as his assistant. She is nicknamed "Chi-chan" by Hinata, and appears to be acquainted with her. She has a habit of kicking Kouta in the groin whenever he touches her hands or sees her underwear.

Comic Heat staff

An editorial staff member for the shōnen manga magazine  and Kouta's former colleague.

The editor-in-chief of Comic Heat and Tohru's superior. She is Hinata's rival who disapproves of her methods of molding manga artists, believing that they should be successful in their own right and that there were a number of artists under her wing that failed to be successful, which is negatively affecting the manga industry. It is revealed that she once worked with Hinata in the past for a manga magazine, though the main reason for her breaking up with Hinata remains unknown. Despite her rivalry, she still has some degree of respect for Hinata, as she refers to her by the senpai honorific. She can also be quite intimidating, especially towards Tohru. Five years later, she is Kouta's editor as well as his wife, and the couple are expecting their first child together.

He briefly hired Kouta as an assistant, but quickly fired him following an ink spill which ruined one of his pages, claiming he does not have what it takes to be a manga author (he admits later on that he is a bit hotheaded when it comes to manga) and explaining to him the realities of the manga industry. It is revealed by Izumi that he was a former employee of Comic Splash, and was Hinata's disciple. Hinata gave Mine his big break on his debut manga "Farewell, Tokyo" which sold 30 million copies, which in turn led to the spread of numerous rumors by her competitors. It is later revealed that Hinata (who was a manager at the time as well as his editor) had collaborated with him on his debut work.

Yū Takashima
A staff editor for Comic Heat.

Comic Splash staff

A member of Comic Splash's editing apartment.

Ozma Studio

A famous manga artist who goes by the pen name Ozma (Stylized as OZMA) and the first manga artist Hinata managed. He is the founder of Ozma Studio and his Ozma System, the director system, which is based on Hinata's teachings. Omura worked exceedingly hard, being Sawanoguchi's debut solely-managed manga artist. His works and common elements inspired Kouta to be a manga artist himself. It is revealed that when Omura was Hinata's protege, they eventually fell in love. Omura began to monopolize Hinata and when she refused, he slandered her, tarnishing her image.

A girl whom Kouta met at a manga cafe after leaving his home following a fallout with Hinata. Like Kouta, she too, is a fan of Ozma's works. It is later revealed that she is the Chief of Ozma Studio and a fellow manga author, as well as the Art Director and author of Revolution x2 (also known as Revo Revo), one of Ozma's works.

Other characters

Volumes
Written by Korean manhwa author Dall-Young Lim and illustrated by Hae-Won Lee, Koimoku began serialization in Kill Time Communication's seinen manga magazine Comic Valkyrie in its March 2011 issue (published on January 27, 2011), and ended in the November 2012 issue (published on September 27, 2012) with twenty chapters published. The first volume was released on July 27, 2011 under KTC's Valkyrie Comics imprint, and the fifth and final volume was released on November 29, 2012.

In South Korea, it is published by Artlim Media, and it is serialized in Comic GT.

 

  
  
|}

Notes

References

External links
Koimoku at Comic Valkyrie

Manga series
2011 manga
Manga creation in anime and manga
Romantic comedy anime and manga
Seinen manga